Selections from Lerner and Loewe's... is an album by drummer Art Blakey and The Jazz Messengers recorded in 1957 and released on the RCA Victor subsidiary label Vik. The album features jazz interpretations of show tunes from Alan Jay Lerner and Frederick Loewe's musicals My Fair Lady, Brigadoon, and Paint Your Wagon.

Reception

Allmusic awarded the album 4 stars, the review by Scott Yanow stating: "One of the rarest of all Art Blakey records... Despite some of the musicians' unfamiliarity with the songs, this date is quite successful".

Track listing 
All compositions by Alan Jay Lerner and Frederick Loewe
 "I Could Have Danced All Night" - 4:16   
 "On the Street Where You Live" - 9:02   
 "There But for You Go I" - 4:34   
 "They Call the Wind Maria" - 4:56   
 "I Talk to the Trees" - 8:58   
 "Almost Like Being in Love" - 4:50

Personnel 
Art Blakey - drums
Bill Hardman - trumpet 
Johnny Griffin - tenor saxophone
Sam Dockery - piano
Spanky DeBrest - bass

References 

Art Blakey albums
The Jazz Messengers albums
1957 albums
RCA Records albums